2-Ethylhexyl acrylate is a colorless liquid acrylate with a pleasant odor, used in the making of paints, plastics and adhesives.

Preparation 
Racemic 2-ethylhexyl acrylate can be prepared with a high yield by esterification of acrylic acid with racemic 2-ethylhexanol in the presence of hydroquinone as a polymerization inhibitor and a strong acid such as methanesulfonic acid by reactive distillation using toluene as an azeotroping agent.

Properties 
2-Ethylhexyl acrylate polymerizes easily. The polymerization can be initiated by light, peroxides, heat, or contaminants. It can react violently when combined with strong oxidants and can form explosive mixtures with air at temperatures above . The chemical, physical, and toxicological properties, however, can be greatly modified by additives or stabilizers.

Use 
2-Ethylhexyl acrylate and butyl acrylate are the major base monomers for the preparation of acrylate adhesives. 2-Ethylhexyl acrylate can react by free-radical polymerization to form macromolecules having a molecular weight of up to 200,000 g/mol. Other monomers such as vinyl acetate, methyl acrylate, and styrene may be copolymerized to modify the properties of the resulting polymer.

References 

Acrylate esters